Simeon Hirsch Weil was a German-Jewish scholar who lived in Carlsruhe in the eighteenth century. He published his father Nathaniel Weil's Netiv ḥayyim, Torat Netan'el, and responsa, and wrote Sefer Eldad ha-Dani (with a Judeo-German translation; 1769).

References
 

18th-century German Jews
18th-century German male writers
Jewish scholars
Writers from Karlsruhe